Marcel Schneider (11 August 1913 – 22 January 2009) was a French writer, laureate of numerous literary awards.

Biography 
Schneider was born in a family of Alsatian origin who chose France after 1871. An agrégé es letters, he taught in Rouen (Jean Lecanuet was among his students), before devoting himself entirely to literature and music. He came to live in Paris and became a member of the publishing house Grasset.

Both as a writer and as a historian of literature, he was an adept of fantastic literature. He recognized three masters in the fantastic field: Charles Nodier, Gérard de Nerval and Ernst Theodor Amadeus Hoffmann.

A very good connoisseur of music, he published works on Schubert and Wagner and traced the history of the ballet since Louis XIV.

A sympathizer of the Action française, he was close to writers as different as André Gide, Georges Dumézil and Paul Morand who bequeathed him his wardrobe. He also attended literary salons including those of Marie-Laure de Noailles, Solange de La Baume, Josette Day and Florence Gould.

In the 1980s, he regularly wrote in Le Quotidien de Paris, founded and directed by Philippe Tesson.

Schneider was awarded the 1996 prix de la langue française.

He is buried at Père Lachaise Cemetery (45th division).

Memoirs 
Schneider published his memoirs in the form of a diary in the following order:
1989: L'Éternité fragile, Paris, Éditions Grasset
1991: Innocence et Vérité, Grasset
1992: Le Palais des mirages, Grasset,
1993: Le Goût de l'absolu, Grasset
2001: Les Gardiens du secret, Grasset, Prix Ève Delacroix

Bibliography 

1947: Le granit et l'absence
1948: Cueillir le romarin
1950: Le chasseur vert
1951: La première île
1952: Le sang léger
1953: L'enfant du dimanche
1955: Aux couleurs de la nuit, short stories
1956: Les deux miroirs
1957: Schubert
1958: L'escurial et l'amour
1959: Wagner
1959: Sauguet
1960: Le jeu de l'Oie
1960: Le Sablier magique, tales illustrated by 
1961: Le cardinal de Virginie
1962: Les colonnes du Temple
1962: La Branche de Merlin
1969: Le Guerrier de pierre, novel
1972: Le Lieutenant perdu, novel
1975: Le Vampire de Düsseldorf, in collaboration with Philippe Brunet
1978: Jean-Jacques Rousseau et l'espoir écologiste1979: Hoffmann1982: La Lumière du Nord, short stories, Grasset, Prix du Livre Inter
1983: Mère Merveille, novel
1985: Histoires à mourir debout, short stories
1985: Histoire de la littérature fantastique en France1987: La Fin du carnaval, short stories
2003: Le Labyrinthe de l'Arioste, essai sur l'allégorique, le légendaire et le stupéfiant1995: Ce que j'aime1997: Paris, lanterne magique 
1999: Ombre perdue de l'Allemagne2002: Esprit du ballet2004: Mille roses trémières. L'amitié de Paul Morand, essay
2005: Jours de féerie, short stories
2006: Moi qui suis né trop tard2009: Il faut laisser maisons et jardins Prizes and distinctions 
1950: Prix Cazes for Le Chasseur vert1976: Prix Marcel Proust for Sur une étoile1982: Prix du Livre Inter for La Lumière du Nord1990: Prix Maurice Genevoix for L'éternité fragile1990: Prix Jean-Freustié for L'Éternité fragile1996: Grand prix de littérature Paul-Morand
1998: Prix de la langue française
2001: Prix Ève Delacroix for Les Gardiens du secret Sources 
 Roger Peyrefitte, Propos secrets, Paris, Albin Michel, 1977
 Matthieu Galey, Journal I (1953-1964), Grasset, 1987
 Matthieu Galey, Journal II (1965-1986), Grasset, 1989
 Jean Dutourd, Diane de Margerie, Christine Jordis,  Solange Fasquelle, Avec Marcel Schneider, Éditions du Rocher, 2005  Hommage à Marcel Schneider'' in Bulletin de "La Route inconnue", bulletin des Amis d'André Dhôtel, n° 23 June 2009

References 

20th-century French novelists
Prix du Livre Inter winners
Prix Jean Freustié winners
1913 births
People from Levallois-Perret
2009 deaths
Burials at Père Lachaise Cemetery